The Standards of Care for the Health of Transgender and Gender Diverse People (SOC) is an international clinical protocol by the World Professional Association for Transgender Health (WPATH) outlining the recommended assessment and treatment for transgender and gender-diverse individuals across the lifespan including social, hormonal, or surgical transition. It often influences clinicians' decisions regarding patients' treatment. While other standards, protocols, and guidelines existespecially outside the United Statesthe WPATH SOC is the most widespread protocol used by professionals working with transgender or gender-variant people.

Version 8 of the WPATH SOC was released online on September 15, 2022.

History and development
Prior to the advent of the first SOC, there was no semblance of consensus on psychiatric, psychological, medical, and surgical requirements or procedures. Before the 1960s, few countries offered safe, legal medical options and many criminalized cross-gender behaviors or mandated unproven psychiatric treatments.  In response to this problem, the Harry Benjamin International Gender Dysphoria Association (now known as the World Professional Association for Transgender Health) authored one of the earliest sets of clinical guidelines for the express purpose of ensuring "lasting personal comfort with the gendered self in order to maximize overall psychological well-being and self-fulfillment."

The WPATH SOC are periodically updated and revised. The eighth and latest version was released on September 15, 2022. Previous versions were released in 1979, 1980, 1981, 1990, 1998, 2001, and 2012.

Version 6
The sixth version, titled "The Harry Benjamin International Gender Dysphoria Association's  Standards Of Care For Gender Identity Disorders", was published in 2001. It recommends that mental health professionals document a patient's relevant history in a letter, which should be required by medical professionals prior to physical intervention. One letter is required for hormone replacement therapy or either augmentation mammoplasty or male chest reconstruction. Two additional letters are needed for genital surgeries.

The Eligibility Criteria and Readiness Criteria in version 6 give certain very specific minimum requirements as prerequisites to HRT or sex reassignment surgery (SRS). Section Nine covers "The Real-life Experience," during which individuals seeking hormonal and other treatments are expected to begin transitioning publicly to their preferred gender role.  Section Twelve, titled "Genital Surgery," deals directly with all concerns about sex reassignment surgery. It includes six "Eligibility Criteria" and two "Readiness Criteria", which are intended to be used by professionals for both diagnosis and guidance before providing patients "letters of recommendation."  For this and other reasons, the WPATH SOC is a controversial and often maligned document among patients seeking medical intervention (hormones, and/or surgery), who state that their legally protected right to proper medical care and treatment is unjustly and unduly withheld or even denied based on the SOC.

The assessment and treatment of children and adolescents was covered in section V of version 6.

Version 7
The seventh version, titled "Standards of Care for the Health of Transsexual, Transgender, and Gender Nonconforming People", was published in 2012. Included in the guidelines are sections on purpose and use of the WPATH SOC, the global applicability of the WPATH SOC, the difference between gender nonconformity and gender dysphoria, epidemiology, treatment of children, adolescents and adults, mental health, hormone replacement therapy (masculinizing or feminizing; HRT), reproductive health, voice and communication therapy, sex reassignment surgery, lifelong preventive and primary care, applicability of the WPATH SOC to people living in institutional environments, and applicability of the WPATH SOC to people with disorders of sex development.

The seventh version also includes acknowledgements of the ever-evolving language used to describe and treat transsexual, transgender, and gender non-conforming individuals. There is an emphasis placed on the idea that identifying with these labels does not inherently qualify someone as disordered, and that treatment should be focused on the alleviation of any suffering caused by gender dysphoria. They make a stance against the "deprivation of civil and human rights" on the grounds of someone's gender identity. This version, much like its predecessor requires referrals for surgical procedures based on set criteria, but notes the importance of informed consent and listening to the wishes of the patient.

The seventh version includes a section distinguishing between cases of gender dysphoria and non-conformity for children and adolescents, as well as recommended treatment paths for each.

Version 8
The eighth version, titled "Standards of Care for the Health of Transgender and Gender Diverse People", was published in 2022. It gives recommendations for health professionals in eighteen chapters. The guidelines were developed by a multidisciplinary committee of experts, building on previous versions and using the Delphi method.

Version 8 is the first one to include a chapter on adolescent care separate from that on the care of children. This version of the protocol gives no specific age limits for treatments, emphasizing the need to decide individually for each patient. An earlier draft would have required several years of transgender identity before an adolescent could begin treatment. After criticism from transgender advocates, this provision was removed in the final release. Despite the criticism, transgender youths wishing to be treated are still required to undergo a "comprehensive diagnostic assessment". It was also criticized for suggesting that young people may come to believe they are transgender through social influence.

The guidelines became a focus of controversy during the debate over the Scottish government's Gender Recognition Reform Bill in 2022. Opponents of the bill highlighted the chapter on eunuchs, which proposes eunuch be considered a gender identity, and criticised NHS Scotland's association with WPATH.

Populations
Issues specific to certain demographics, including adults, children, and adolescents, are described in Chapters 5-11.

Adults

Adolescents
In a departure from previous versions, Version 8 draws a conceptual distinction between Adolescents and Children with separate chapters. 

Continued care and careful assessment of cognitive maturity by qualified mental health professionals is recommended.  In contrast to previous versions, there are no absolute requirements for duration of assessments or age to access gender-affirming treatments; rather, individual psychosocial and physical development should be taken into account.

Additionally, Chapter 12 and 13 and Appendix D contain further recommendations regarding hormone therapy and surgical treatments in adolescents.

Children
Pertaining to prepubescent children only, chapter 7 makes recommendations regarding the support of children and their families throughout gender exploration and potential social transitions.

Non-binary
Non-binary individuals are included for the first time in chapter 8.  The guidelines recommend that medical treatment and social support be made available to non-binary people in individualized combinations, for example providing medical interventions without social transition or gender-affirming surgery without hormone therapy.  The chapter additionally notes unique experiences of discrimination, minority stress, and difficulty accessing gender-affirming medical treatment among non-binary people, which healthcare providers should take into consideration.

Treatments
Recommendations for treatments, including medical and social aspects of gender transition as well as mental health, as are given in Chapters 12-18.

See also
 Transgender health care
 List of transgender-related topics

References

External links
 WPATH Standards of Care
 Health Law Standards of Care for Transsexualism

Gender transitioning and medicine
Medical ethics
Transgender studies